This is a list of nominated candidates for the Green Party of Canada in the 40th Canadian federal election. Candidates ran in all but five ridings: Humber—St. Barbe—Baie Verte (NL), Cumberland—Colchester—Musquodoboit Valley (NS), Jonquière—Alma (QC), Saint-Laurent—Cartierville (QC), Sherbrooke (QC).

Newfoundland and Labrador - 7 seats

Prince Edward Island - 4 seats

Nova Scotia - 11 seats

New Brunswick - 10 seats

Quebec - 75 seats

Abitibi—Baie-James—Nunavik—Eeyou
Patrick Rancourt

Abitibi—Témiscamingue
Bruno Côté

Ahuntsic 
Lynette Tremblay

Alfred-Pellan 
Tristan Desjardins Drouin

Argenteuil—Papineau—Mirabel
Pierre Audette

Beauce 
Nicolas Rochette

Beauharnois—Salaberry
David Smith

Beauport—Limoilou
Luc Côté

Berthier—Maskinongé
Denis Lefebvre

Bourassa 
François Boucher

Brossard—La Prairie 
Sonia Ziadé

Chambly—Borduas
Olivier Adam

Charlesbourg—Haute-Saint-Charles
François Bédard

Châteauguay—Saint-Constant
Brian Sarwer-Foner

Chicoutimi—Le Fjord 
Jean-François Veilleux

Compton—Stanstead
Gary Caldwell

Drummond
Réginald Gagnon

Gaspésie—Îles-de-la-Madeleine
Julien Leblanc

Gatineau
David Inglis

Haute-Gaspésie—La Mitis—Matane—Matapédia 
Louis Drainville

Hochelaga 
Philippe Larochelle

Honoré-Mercier
Gaetan Bérard

Hull—Aylmer
Frédéric Pouyot

Jeanne-Le Ber 
Véronik Sansoucy

Joliette 
Annie Durette

Jonquière—Alma
No candidate

La Pointe-de-l'Île
Domita Cundari

Lac-Saint-Louis 
Peter Graham

LaSalle—Émard
Kristina Vitelli

Laurentides—Labelle
Jacques Rigal

Laurier—Sainte-Marie
Dylan Percival-Maxwell

Laval 
Eric Madelein

Laval—Les Îles 
Brent Neil

Lévis—Bellechasse
Lynne Champoux-Williams

Longueuil—Pierre-Boucher
Danielle Moreau

Lotbinière—Chutes-de-la-Chaudière
Shirley Picknell

Louis-Hébert 
Michèle Fontaine

Louis-Saint-Laurent 
Jean Cloutier

Manicouagan 
Jacques Gélineau

Marc-Aurèle-Fortin 
Lise Bissonnette

Mégantic—L'Érable
Jean Guernon

Montcalm
Michel Paulette

Montmagny—L'Islet—Kamouraska—Rivière-du-Loup
Claude Gaumond

Montmorency—Charlevoix—Haute-Côte-Nord
Jacques Legros

Mount Royal 
Tyrell Alexander

Notre-Dame-de-Grâce—Lachine
Jessica Gal

Papineau 
Ingrid Hein

Pierrefonds—Dollard
Ryan Young

Pontiac 
André Sylvestre

Portneuf—Jacques-Cartier
Nathan Weatherdon

Québec
Yonnel Bonaventure

Repentigny
Paul Fournier

Richmond—Arthabaska
François Fillon

Rimouski-Neigette—Témiscouata—Les Basques
James Morisson

Rivière-des-Mille-Îles
Marie Martine Bédard

Rivière-du-Nord 
Rene Piche

Roberval—Lac-Saint-Jean
Jocelyn Tremblay

Rosemont—La Petite-Patrie 
Vincent Larochelle

Saint-Bruno—Saint-Hubert
Simon Bernier

Saint-Hyacinthe—Bagot
Jacques Tétreault

Saint-Jean
Pierre Tremblay

Saint-Lambert 
Diane Joubert

Saint-Laurent—Cartierville
No candidate due to deal between Elizabeth May and Liberal Party leader Stéphane Dion not to run candidates in each other's ridings.

Saint-Léonard—Saint-Michel
Frank Monteleone

Saint-Maurice—Champlain
Martial Toupin

Sherbrooke 
No candidate.

Terrebonne—Blainville
Martin Drapeau

Trois-Rivières 
Ariane Blais

Vaudreuil—Soulanges
Jean-Yves Massenet

Verchères—Les Patriotes 
Annie Morel

Westmount—Ville-Marie
Claude William Genest

Ontario - 106 seats

Ajax—Pickering
Mikhel Harilaid

Algoma—Manitoulin—Kapuskasing
Lorraine Rekmans

Ancaster—Dundas—Flamborough—Westdale
Peter Ormond

Barrie
Erich Jacoby-Hawkins

Beaches—East York 
Zoran Markovski

Bramalea—Gore—Malton
Mark Pajot

Brampton—Springdale: Dave Finlay
Dave Finlay

Brampton West 
Patti Chmelyk

Brant 
Nora Fueten

Bruce—Grey—Owen Sound 
Dick Hibma

Burlington
Marnie Mellish

Cambridge 
Scott Cosman

Carleton—Mississippi Mills 
Jake Cole

Chatham-Kent—Essex
Alina Abbott

Davenport 
Wayne Scott

Don Valley East 
Wayne Clements

Don Valley West 
Georgina Wilcock

Dufferin—Caledon
Ard Van Leeuwen

Durham
Stephen Leahy

Eglinton—Lawrence
Andrew James

Elgin—Middlesex—London
Noel Burgon

Essex 
Richard Bachynsky 

Richard Bachynsky is an environmentalist, writer, and consultant. Richard has been active in environmental interests since the mid-1980s, when he began to travel as a consultant. He was to see the complete disregard for environmental issues evident in both developing countries and North America.

Richard was born and raised in the Windsor area, and has seen the rapid decline of the region in terms of jobs, environmental issues, and health related issues. With the failure of recent members of Parliament to attract new industry, improve the environment, or create better infrastructure, members of the community are motivated for change.

A region rich in agriculture, industry, and resources, it is inconceivable – but true – that the region has one of Canada's highest unemployment rates. The residents of the region are being shortchanged, and need better federal support for job creation, tourism promotion, small business assistance, health care, and seniors.

Active in finance, Richard has worked towards establishing new green industries including tire and industrial waste rubber recycling, biodiesel fuel plants, and alternative energy development worldwide. He also has extensive experience in real estate management and financing, and has served as a consultant for numerous firms completing projects both in Canada, and internationally. He currently holds of the position of Vice President International Sales and Finance for GreenShift Corporation, NY, NY USA, is Head of Export Finance Department, Roberts &Schaefer Engineering and Construction, USA., Finance Dir for Alternativa Corporation, Ukraine and is a Broker for Argentum Mortgages Toronto, and a consultant for Bachynsky Group, Bachynsky Realty Inc., and Bachynsky Mortgage Corporation, Windsor.

Richard holds an MBA and is certified as a mortgage broker in Ontario. He is a member of the Board of the Amherstburg Chamber of Commerce. Previously, he was a member of parent and teacher association of F.J. Brennan High School in Windsor, and of the OMBA. In addition, he was active as a coach for minor hockey for the Windsor Minor Hockey Association, Riverside Hockey Association, and the Patterson Chiefs Hockey Program. Richard is the parent of 3 teenagers Erik, Laura, and Daniel.

Richard Bachynsky was the candidate for the Green Party of Canada for the Federal election of 2008.

Richard Bachynsky is currently the nominated candidate for the Green Party of Canada for the riding of Windsor-Tecumseh.

Etobicoke Centre 
Marion Schaffer

Etobicoke—Lakeshore
David Corail

Etobicoke North 
Nigel Barriffe

Glengarry—Prescott—Russell
Sylvie Lemieux

Guelph 
Mike Nagy

Haldimand—Norfolk
Stephana Johnston

Haliburton—Kawartha Lakes—Brock: Michael Bell
Michael Bell owns a publishing company, and has published The Wire and The Green Zine. He is also a singer-songwriter and has worked with the Peterborough Food Bank, Peterborough Flood Relief, World Vision, the United Way and Amnesty International. He has spent the majority of his life in Peterborough, although he says he became involved with the environmental movement while living in Australia between 2006 and 2008. He initially sought the Green Party nomination for Peterborough in the buildup to the 2008 election, but either withdrew from the contest or was defeated by rival candidate Emily Berrigan. Running in Haliburton—Kawartha Lakes—Brock, he limited his election expenses to only two dollars in 2008. He received 4,505 votes (8.29%), finishing fourth against Conservative incumbent Barry Devolin.

Halton
Amy Collard

Hamilton Centre
John Livingstone

Hamilton East—Stoney Creek
Dave Hart Dyke

Hamilton Mountain
Stephen Brotherston

Huron—Bruce
Glen Smith

Kenora
Jo Jo Holiday

Kingston and the Islands
Eric Walton

Kitchener Centre
John Bithell

Kitchener—Conestoga
Jamie Kropf

Kitchener—Waterloo
Cathy MacLellan

Lambton—Kent—Middlesex
Jim Johnston

Lanark—Frontenac—Lennox and Addington
Chris Walker

Leeds—Grenville
Jeanie Warnock

London—Fanshawe
Daniel O'Neail

London North Centre
Mary Ann Hodge

London West
Monica Jarabek

Markham—Unionville
Leonard Aitken

Mississauga—Brampton South
Grace Yogaretnam

Mississauga East—Cooksville
Jaymini Bhikha

Mississauga—Erindale
Richard Pietro

Mississauga South
Richard Laushway

Mississauga—Streetsville
Otto Casanova

Nepean—Carleton
Lori Gadzala

Newmarket—Aurora
Glenn Hubbers

Niagara Falls
Shawn Willick

Niagara West—Glanbrook
Sid Frere

Nickel Belt
Frederick Twilley

Nipissing—Timiskaming
Craig Bridges

Northumberland—Quinte West
Ralph Torrie

Oak Ridges—Markham
Richard Taylor

Oakville
Blake Poland

Oshawa
Pat Gostlin was a retired teacher. She was killed in a car accident involving a suspected drunk driver on 26 October 2008, less than two weeks following the election.

Ottawa Centre
Jen Hunter 

Hunter has been an executive member of Equal Voice National Capital Chapter, has led an annual international Team Learning Adventure, was co-leader of a women's leadership event in Toronto, and was the first international board member for the Appalachian Trail Conservancy. She is also the founder of the Learning Catalyst. Hunter attended Queen's University, where she received her honours degree in political studies. Hunter chose to run for office in order to increase the number of women running.  She believes in giving more federal money to cities, and in income splitting.

Ottawa—Orléans
Paul Maillet

Ottawa South
Qais Ghanem

Ottawa—Vanier
Akbar Manoussi

Ottawa West—Nepean
Frances Coates

Oxford
Cathy Mott

Parkdale—High Park
Robert L. Rishchynski

Parry Sound—Muskoka: Glen Hodgson
Glen Hodgson was raised in Orillia. He has a Bachelor's degree in English and Environmental Studies from Trent University and a Bachelor of Education degree from Queen's University. A high school teacher by profession, he is also a newspaper columnist and has served on the West Parry Sound District Museum and the Georgian Bay Biosphere Reserve.

Hodgson joined the Green Party while attending Trent in the early 1990s and has run for the party in four federal elections and one provincial election. He has been nominated as the party's candidate for Parry Sound—Muskoka in the 2011 federal election. He briefly joined the Progressive Conservative Party of Canada in 1998 to support David Orchard's leadership bid.

He criticized the heightened security at the 2010 G8 summit in Huntsville and the 2010 G20 summit in Toronto, and said that he would protest peacefully at the "People First! We Deserve Better" rally.

Perth—Wellington
John Cowling

Peterborough: Emily Berrigan
Emily Berrigan was twenty-one years old at the time of the election. She became active with the Green Party while attending high school in Port Hope, Ontario, and later worked for eight months at party headquarters in Ottawa. During the election, she noted that she was from a working class background. She received 4,029 votes (6.91%), finishing fourth against Conservative incumbent Dean Del Mastro. She later moved to Toronto and became project manager for a non-governmental organization.

Berrigan was one of several people arrested on 26 June 2010, at the G20 Toronto protests. After taking part in non-violent protests, and wandering the streets in observation, she and a group of friends returned to Queen's Park in the evening for their bicycles. She was arrested while standing in the designated protest zone and taken to a detention centre, where she was kept in a small cage that was exposed to pepper spray and not given food or water for eight hours. She was released the next day, after being charged with obstruction and unlawful demonstration. Berrigan has described her arrest as "completely unacceptable" and the arrest conditions as "inhumane."

Pickering—Scarborough East
Jason Becevello

Prince Edward—Hastings
Alan Coxwell

Renfrew—Nipissing—Pembroke
Ben Hoffman

Richmond Hill
Dylan Marando

St. Catharines
Jim Fannon

St. Paul's
Justin Erdman

Sarnia—Lambton
Alan McKeown

Sault Ste. Marie
Luke Macmichael

Scarborough—Agincourt
Adrian Molder

Scarborough Centre 
Ella Ng

Scarborough—Guildwood
Alonzo Bartley

Scarborough—Rouge River
Attila Nagy

Scarborough Southwest
Stefan Dixon

Simcoe—Grey
Peter Ellis

Simcoe North
Valerie Powell

Stormont—Dundas—South Glengarry
David Rawnsley

Sudbury
Gordon Harris has been a sales and marketing manager and a publisher. He moved to Sudbury in 2002 and became president of the Sudbury Arts Council in 2007. Before joining the Green Party, he worked on election campaigns for the Progressive Conservative Party of Ontario and the Liberal Party of Canada. He aligned with the Greens in the 2003 provincial election, and has served on the party's provincial executive. In the 2008 election, Harris said that he was not aligned with either a right-wing or left-wing ideology. He received 3,330 votes (7.75%), finishing fourth against New Democratic Party candidate Glenn Thibeault. He planned to seek the party's nomination again for the 2011 federal election, but later withdrew.

Thornhill
Norbert Koehl

Thunder Bay—Rainy River
Russ Aegard

Thunder Bay—Superior North
Brendan Hughes

Timmins—James Bay
Larry Verner

Toronto Centre
Ellen Michelson

Toronto—Danforth
Sharon Howarth

Trinity—Spadina
Stephen LaFrenie

Vaughan
Adrian Visentin

Welland
Jennifer Mooradian

Wellington—Halton Hills
Brent Bouteiller

Whitby—Oshawa
Doug Anderson

Willowdale
Lou Carcasole

Windsor—Tecumseh
Kyle Prestanski

Windsor West
John Esposito

York Centre
Rosemary Frei

York—Simcoe
John Dewar

York South—Weston
Andre Papadimitriou

York West
Nick Capra

Manitoba - 14 seats

Saskatchewan - 14 seats

Alberta - 28 seats

Calgary Centre
Natalie Odd

Calgary Centre-North
Eric Donovan

Calgary East
Nathan Coates

Calgary Northeast
Abeed Monty Ahmad

Calgary—Nose Hill
Tony Hajj

Calgary Southeast
Margaret Chandler

Calgary Southwest
Kelly Christie

Calgary West
Randy Weeks

Crowfoot
Kaity Kettenbach

Edmonton Centre
David J. Parker

Edmonton East
Trey Capnerhurst

Edmonton—Leduc
Valerie Kennedy

Edmonton—Mill Woods—Beaumont
David Allan Hrushka

Edmonton—St. Albert
Peter Johnston

Edmonton—Sherwood Park
Nina Erfani

Edmonton—Spruce Grove
Wendy Walker

Edmonton—Strathcona
Jane Thrall

Fort McMurray—Athabasca
Dylan Richards

Lethbridge
Amanda Swagar

Macleod
Jared McCollum

Medicine Hat
Kevin Dodd

Peace River
Jennifer Villebrun

Red Deer
Evan Bedford

Vegreville—Wainwright
Will Munsey

Westlock—St. Paul
Aden Murphy

Wetaskiwin
Les Parsons

Wild Rose
Lisa Fox

Yellowhead
Monika Schaefer

British Columbia - 36 seats

Abbotsford
Karen Durant

British Columbia Southern Interior
Andy Morel

Burnaby—Douglas
Doug Perry

Burnaby—New Westminster
Carrie-Ann McLaren

Cariboo—Prince George
Amber van Drielen

Chilliwack—Fraser Canyon
Barbara LeBeau

Delta—Richmond East
Matt Laine

Esquimalt—Juan de Fuca
Brian Gordon

Fleetwood—Port Kells
Brian Newbold

Kamloops—Thompson—Cariboo
Donovan Cavers

Kelowna—Lake Country
Angela Reid

Kootenay—Columbia
Ralph Moore

Langley
Patrick Meyer

Nanaimo—Alberni
John Fryer

Nanaimo—Cowichan
Christina Knighton

Newton—North Delta
Liz Walker

New Westminster—Coquitlam
Marshall Smith

North Vancouver
Jim Stephenson

Okanagan—Coquihalla
Dan Bouchard

Okanagan—Shuswap
Huguette Allen

Pitt Meadows—Maple Ridge—Mission
Mike Gildersleeve

Port Moody—Westwood—Port Coquitlam
Rod Brindamour

Prince George—Peace River
Hilary Crowley

Richmond
Michael Wolfe

Saanich—Gulf Islands
Andrew Lewis

Skeena—Bulkley Valley
Hondo Arendt

South Surrey—White Rock—Cloverdale
David Blair

Surrey North
Dan Kashamanga

Vancouver Centre
Adriane Carr

Vancouver East
Mike Carr

Vancouver Island North
Philip Stone

Vancouver Kingsway
Doug Warkentin

Vancouver Quadra
Daniel Grice

Vancouver South
Csaba Gulyas

Victoria
Adam Saab

West Vancouver—Sunshine Coast—Sea to Sky Country
Blair Wilson

Yukon - 1 seat

Northwest Territories - 1 seat

Nunavut - 1 seat

See also
Results of the Canadian federal election, 2008
Results by riding for the Canadian federal election, 2008

References

External links
 Candidates List on Green Party website
 Green Party of Canada – list of Shadow Cabinet Critics
 AGM results, Green Party of Alberta
  Elections Ontario
  Elections Canada

 
Green Party of Canada candidates in Canadian Federal elections
candidates in the 2008 Canadian federal election